Joseph Musa is an Anglican bishop in Nigeria: since his consecration on 13 March 2005 he has been the Bishop of Idah, one of seventeen within the Anglican Province of Abuja, itself one of 14 provinces within the Church of Nigeria.

Notes

Living people
Anglican bishops of Idah
21st-century Anglican bishops in Nigeria
Year of birth missing (living people)